Loona is a South Korean girl group formed by Blockberry Creative.

Loona may also refer to:

 Loóna, a mobile app geared towards relaxation and sleep
 Loona (Punjabi epic), a Punjabi epic verse play written by Shiv Kumar Batalvi
 Loona (singer) (born 1974), Dutch singer, songwriter and dancer
 Loona, Estonia, a village in Western Estonia
 Loona, a character in the adult animated web-series Helluva Boss

See also 
 
 Luna (disambiguation)